Pimpini is a surname. Notable people with the surname include: 

Alberto Pimpini (born 1997), Italian curler
Denise Pimpini (born 1995), Italian curler

Italian-language surnames